This is a list of butterflies of the Republic of the Congo. About 892 species are known from the Republic of the Congo, 20 of which are endemic.

Papilionidae

Papilioninae

Papilionini
Papilio antimachus Drury, 1782
Papilio zalmoxis Hewitson, 1864
Papilio nireus Linnaeus, 1758
Papilio chrapkowskoides nurettini Koçak, 1983
Papilio sosia pulchra Berger, 1950
Papilio cynorta Fabricius, 1793
Papilio dardanus Brown, 1776
Papilio phorcas congoanus Rothschild, 1896
Papilio zenobia Fabricius, 1775
Papilio filaprae Suffert, 1904
Papilio gallienus Distant, 1879
Papilio mechowi Dewitz, 1881
Papilio hesperus Westwood, 1843

Leptocercini
Graphium antheus (Cramer, 1779)
Graphium policenes (Cramer, 1775)
Graphium biokoensis (Gauthier, 1984)
Graphium policenoides (Holland, 1892)
Graphium colonna (Ward, 1873)
Graphium illyris hamatus (Joicey & Talbot, 1918)
Graphium angolanus baronis (Ungemach, 1932)
Graphium ridleyanus (White, 1843)
Graphium leonidas (Fabricius, 1793)
Graphium tynderaeus (Fabricius, 1793)
Graphium latreillianus theorini (Aurivillius, 1881)
Graphium adamastor (Boisduval, 1836)
Graphium schubotzi (Schultze, 1913)
Graphium almansor escherichi (Gaede, 1915)
Graphium auriger (Butler, 1876)
Graphium fulleri fulleri (Grose-Smith, 1883)
Graphium fulleri boulleti (Le Cerf, 1912)
Graphium ucalegonides (Staudinger, 1884)
Graphium hachei hachei (Dewitz, 1881)
Graphium hachei moebii (Suffert, 1904)
Graphium aurivilliusi (Seeldrayers, 1896)
Graphium ucalegon (Hewitson, 1865)
Graphium simoni (Aurivillius, 1899)

Pieridae

Pseudopontiinae
Pseudopontia paradoxa (Felder & Felder, 1869)

Coliadinae
Eurema brigitta (Stoll, [1780])
Eurema regularis (Butler, 1876)
Eurema hecabe solifera (Butler, 1875)
Eurema senegalensis (Boisduval, 1836)
Catopsilia florella (Fabricius, 1775)

Pierinae
Colotis celimene sudanicus (Aurivillius, 1905)
Nepheronia argia (Fabricius, 1775)
Nepheronia pharis (Boisduval, 1836)
Nepheronia thalassina verulanus (Ward, 1871)
Leptosia alcesta (Stoll, [1782])
Leptosia hybrida Bernardi, 1952
Leptosia marginea (Mabille, 1890)
Leptosia nupta (Butler, 1873)

Pierini
Appias epaphia (Cramer, [1779])
Appias perlucens (Butler, 1898)
Appias phaola (Doubleday, 1847)
Appias sabina (Felder & Felder, [1865])
Appias sylvia (Fabricius, 1775)
Mylothris alcuana Grünberg, 1910
Mylothris asphodelus Butler, 1888
Mylothris chloris (Fabricius, 1775)
Mylothris continua maxima Berger, 1981
Mylothris flaviana interposita Joicey & Talbot, 1921
Mylothris hilara goma Berger, 1981
Mylothris rhodope (Fabricius, 1775)
Mylothris schumanni Suffert, 1904
Dixeia capricornus falkensteinii (Dewitz, 1879)
Dixeia cebron (Ward, 1871)
Belenois aurota (Fabricius, 1793)
Belenois calypso dentigera Butler, 1888
Belenois sudanensis pseudodentigera Berger, 1981
Belenois theuszi (Dewitz, 1889)

Lycaenidae

Miletinae

Liphyrini
Euliphyra mirifica Holland, 1890
Euliphyra leucyania (Hewitson, 1874)
Aslauga confusa Libert, 1994
Aslauga kallimoides Schultze, 1912
Aslauga lamborni Bethune-Baker, 1914
Aslauga pandora Druce, 1913
Aslauga purpurascens Holland, 1890
Aslauga vininga (Hewitson, 1875)

Miletini
Megalopalpus metaleucus Karsch, 1893
Megalopalpus zymna (Westwood, 1851)
Lachnocnema triangularis Libert, 1996
Lachnocnema emperamus (Snellen, 1872)
Lachnocnema divergens Gaede, 1915
Lachnocnema reutlingeri Holland, 1892
Lachnocnema nigrocellularis Libert, 1996
Lachnocnema luna Druce, 1910
Lachnocnema jolyana Libert, 1996
Lachnocnema magna Aurivillius, 1895
Lachnocnema albimacula Libert, 1996
Lachnocnema exiguus Holland, 1890
Lachnocnema congoensis Libert, 1996 (endemic)

Poritiinae

Liptenini
Ptelina carnuta (Hewitson, 1873)
Pentila bitje Druce, 1910
Pentila christina Suffert, 1904
Pentila cloetensi aspasia Grünberg, 1910
Pentila fallax Bethune-Baker, 1915
Pentila inconspicua Druce, 1910
Pentila nero (Grose-Smith & Kirby, 1894) (endemic)
Pentila pauli leopardina Schultze, 1923
Pentila rotha Hewitson, 1873
Pentila tachyroides Dewitz, 1879
Pentila torrida (Kirby, 1887)
Pentila umangiana prodita Schultze, 1923
Liptenara hiendlmayri (Dewitz, 1887)
Telipna aurivillii Rebel, 1914
Telipna albofasciata Aurivillius, 1910
Telipna ja Bethune-Baker, 1926
Telipna cameroonensis Jackson, 1969
Telipna cuypersi Libert, 2005
Telipna atrinervis Hulstaert, 1924
Telipna villiersi Stempffer, 1965
Telipna acraeoides (Grose-Smith & Kirby, 1890)
Telipna hollandi exsuperia Hulstaert, 1924
Telipna citrimaculata Schultze, 1916
Telipna transverstigma Druce, 1910
Telipna sanguinea (Plötz, 1880)
Telipna nyanza katangae Stempffer, 1961
Telipna ruspinoides Schultze, 1923
Ornipholidotos kirbyi (Aurivillius. 1895)
Ornipholidotos ugandae goodi Libert, 2000
Ornipholidotos bitjeensis Stempffer, 1957
Ornipholidotos gabonensis Stempffer, 1947
Ornipholidotos bakotae Stempffer, 1962
Ornipholidotos etoumbi Stempffer, 1967
Ornipholidotos katangae kelle Stempffer, 1967
Ornipholidotos annae Libert, 2005
Ornipholidotos amieti Libert, 2005
Ornipholidotos dowsetti Collins & Larsen, 2000 (endemic)
Ornipholidotos overlaeti fontainei Libert, 2005
Ornipholidotos congoensis Stempffer, 1964
Ornipholidotos likouala Stempffer, 1969 (endemic)
Ornipholidotos jacksoni occidentalis Libert, 2005
Ornipholidotos sylpha (Kirby, 1890)
Ornipholidotos nbeti Libert, 2005
Ornipholidotos henrii Libert, 2000
Ornipholidotos tirza (Hewitson, 1873)
Ornipholidotos nancy Collins & Larsen, 2000 (endemic)
Ornipholidotos paradoxa (Druce, 1910)
Ornipholidotos perfragilis (Holland, 1890)
Torbenia aurivilliusi (Stempffer, 1967)
Torbenia stempfferi cuypersi Libert, 2005
Mimacraea abriana Libert & Collins, 2000
Mimacraea apicalis gabonica Libert, 2000
Mimacraea krausei Dewitz, 1889
Mimacraea landbecki Druce, 1910
Mimacraea neurata Holland, 1895
Mimacraea fulvaria Aurivillius, 1895
Mimeresia cellularis (Kirby, 1890)
Mimeresia debora debora (Kirby, 1890)
Mimeresia debora deborula (Aurivillius, 1899)
Mimeresia drucei (Stempffer, 1954)
Mimeresia moreelsi tessmanni (Grünberg, 1910)
Mimeresia pseudocellularis Stempffer, 1968 (endemic)
Mimeresia russulus (Druce, 1910)
Liptena amabilis Schultze, 1923
Liptena batesana Bethune-Baker, 1926
Liptena congoana Hawker-Smith, 1933
Liptena decipiens etoumbi Stempffer, Bennett & May, 1974
Liptena decipiens leucostola (Holland, 1890)
Liptena durbania Bethune-Baker, 1915
Liptena fatima (Kirby, 1890)
Liptena flavicans praeusta Schultze, 1917
Liptena inframacula Hawker-Smith, 1933
Liptena modesta (Kirby, 1890)
Liptena nigromarginata Stempffer, 1961
Liptena ochrea Hawker-Smith, 1933
Liptena opaca centralis Stempffer, Bennett & May, 1974
Liptena orubrum (Holland, 1890)
Liptena ouesso ouesso Stempffer, Bennett & May, 1974
Liptena ouesso mayombe Stempffer, Bennett & May, 1974
Liptena perobscura Druce, 1910
Liptena praestans congoensis Schultze, 1923
Liptena turbata (Kirby, 1890)
Liptena undularis Hewitson, 1866
Liptena xanthostola (Holland, 1890)
Obania tullia (Staudinger, 1892)
Kakumia ferruginea (Schultze, 1923)
Kakumia ideoides (Dewitz, 1887)
Tetrarhanis ilala etoumbi (Stempffer, 1964)
Tetrarhanis ilma (Hewitson, 1873)
Tetrarhanis nubifera (Druce, 1910)
Tetrarhanis okwangwo Larsen, 1998
Tetrarhanis rougeoti (Stempffer, 1954)
Tetrarhanis simplex (Aurivillius, 1895)
Tetrarhanis souanke (Stempffer, 1962) (endemic)
Tetrarhanis stempfferi (Berger, 1954)
Falcuna hollandi nigricans Stempffer & Bennett, 1963
Falcuna lybia (Staudinger, 1892)
Falcuna margarita (Suffert, 1904)
Falcuna synesia gabonensis Stempffer & Bennett, 1963
Larinopoda lircaea (Hewitson, 1866)
Larinopoda tera (Hewitson, 1873)
Micropentila adelgitha (Hewitson, 1874)
Micropentila alberta (Staudinger, 1892)
Micropentila bakotae Stempffer & Bennett, 1965 (endemic)
Micropentila brunnea centralis Bennett, 1966
Micropentila cingulum Druce, 1910
Micropentila flavopunctata Stempffer & Bennett, 1965
Micropentila fulvula Hawker-Smith, 1933
Micropentila gabunica Stempffer & Bennett, 1965
Micropentila kelleana Stempffer & Bennett, 1965 (endemic)
Micropentila ogojae Stempffer & Bennett, 1965
Micropentila souanke Stempffer & Bennett, 1965 (endemic)
Micropentila ugandae Hawker-Smith, 1933
Pseuderesia eleaza (Hewitson, 1873)
Eresina bergeri Stempffer, 1956
Eresina likouala Stempffer, 1962 (endemic)
Eresina rougeoti Stempffer, 1956
Eresiomera campbelli Collins & Larsen, 1998
Eresiomera clenchi (Stempffer, 1961)
Eresiomera isca (Hewitson, 1873)
Eresiomera magnimacula (Rebel, 1914)
Eresiomera nancy Collins & Larsen, 1998
Eresiomera osheba (Holland, 1890)
Eresiomera ouesso (Stempffer, 1962)
Eresiomera paradoxa (Schultze, 1917)
Eresiomera phaeochiton (Grünberg, 1910)
Eresiomera phillipi Collins & Larsen, 1998
Eresiomera rougeoti (Stempffer, 1961)
Eresiomera rutilo (Druce, 1910)
Citrinophila erastus (Hewitson, 1866)
Citrinophila tenera (Kirby, 1887)
Citrinophila terias Joicey & Talbot, 1921
Citrinophila unipunctata Bethune-Baker, 1908
Argyrocheila undifera Staudinger, 1892

Epitolini
Toxochitona gerda (Kirby, 1890)
Toxochitona sankuru Stempffer, 1961
Iridana exquisita (Grose-Smith, 1898)
Epitola posthumus (Fabricius, 1793)
Epitola urania Kirby, 1887
Epitola uranioides uranoides Libert, 1999
Cerautola ceraunia (Hewitson, 1873)
Cerautola crowleyi leucographa Libert, 1999
Cerautola miranda vidua (Talbot, 1935)
Cerautola hewitsoni (Mabille, 1877)
Cerautola hewitsonioides (Hawker-Smith, 1933)
Geritola amieti Libert, 1999
Geritola dubia (Jackson, 1964)
Geritola gerina (Hewitson, 1878)
Geritola goodii (Holland, 1890)
Geritola larae Collins & Libert, 1999
Geritola mirifica (Jackson, 1964)
Geritola nitidica Libert & Collins, 1999
Stempfferia carcassoni Jackson, 1962
Stempfferia alba (Jackson, 1962)
Stempfferia annae Libert, 1999
Stempfferia badura (Kirby, 1890)
Stempfferia cercene (Hewitson, 1873)
Stempfferia cercenoides (Holland, 1890)
Stempfferia cinerea (Berger, 1981)
Stempfferia coerulea (Jackson, 1962)
Stempfferia congoana (Aurivillius, 1923)
Stempfferia flavoantennata (Roche, 1954)
Stempfferia gordoni (Druce, 1903)
Stempfferia insulana (Aurivillius, 1923)
Stempfferia iturina (Joicey & Talbot, 1921)
Stempfferia magnifica (Jackson, 1964)
Stempfferia marginata (Kirby, 1887)
Stempfferia michelae centralis Libert, 1999
Stempfferia similis Libert, 1999
Stempfferia sylviae Libert, 1999
Stempfferia tumentia (Druce, 1910)
Stempfferia zelza (Hewitson, 1873)
Cephetola catuna (Kirby, 1890)
Cephetola cephena (Hewitson, 1873)
Cephetola ghesquierei (Roche, 1954)
Cephetola maculata (Hawker-Smith, 1926)
Cephetola nigeriae (Jackson, 1962)
Cephetola ouesso (Jackson, 1962)
Cephetola pinodes budduana (Talbot, 1937)
Cephetola sublustris (Bethune-Baker, 1904)
Cephetola vinalli (Talbot, 1935)
Cephetola viridana (Joicey & Talbot, 1921)
Batelusia zebra Druce, 1910
Pseudoneaveia jacksoni Stempffer, 1964 (endemic)
Neaveia lamborni orientalis Jackson, 1962
Epitolina dispar (Kirby, 1887)
Epitolina melissa (Druce, 1888)
Epitolina collinsi Libert, 2000
Epitolina larseni Libert, 2000
Hypophytala benitensis (Holland, 1890)
Hypophytala henleyi (Kirby, 1890)
Hypophytala hyetta (Hewitson, 1873)
Hypophytala reducta (Aurivillius, 1923)
Hypophytala ultramarina Libert & Collins, 1999
Phytala elais Westwood, 1851
Neoepitola barombiensis (Kirby, 1890)
Aethiopana honorius (Fabricius, 1793)
Hewitsonia bitjeana Bethune-Baker, 1915
Hewitsonia beryllina Schultze, 1916
Hewitsonia boisduvalii (Hewitson, 1869)
Hewitsonia inexpectata Bouyer, 1997
Hewitsonia kirbyi Dewitz, 1879
Hewitsonia similis (Aurivillius, 1891)
Powellana cottoni Bethune-Baker, 1908

Aphnaeinae
Pseudaletis michelae Libert, 2007
Pseudaletis antimachus (Staudinger, 1888)
Pseudaletis batesi Druce, 1910
Lipaphnaeus leonina (Druce, 1910)
Cigaritis apuleia (Hulstaert, 1924)
Cigaritis dufranei (Bouyer, 1991)
Cigaritis homeyeri (Dewitz, 1887)
Aphnaeus argyrocyclus Holland, 1890
Aphnaeus asterius Plötz, 1880
Aphnaeus chapini occidentalis Clench, 1963
Aphnaeus orcas (Drury, 1782)

Theclinae
Myrina silenus (Fabricius, 1775)
Myrina subornata Lathy, 1903
Oxylides albata (Aurivillius, 1895)
Oxylides gloveri Hawker-Smith, 1929
Syrmoptera bonifacei Stempffer, 1961
Syrmoptera melanomitra Karsch, 1895
Dapidodigma demeter Clench, 1961
Hypolycaena antifaunus (Westwood, 1851)
Hypolycaena clenchi Larsen, 1997
Hypolycaena dubia Aurivillius, 1895
Hypolycaena hatita Hewitson, 1865
Hypolycaena kakumi Larsen, 1997
Hypolycaena lebona (Hewitson, 1865)
Hypolycaena naara Hewitson, 1873
Hypolycaena nigra Bethune-Baker, 1914
Iolaus bolissus Hewitson, 1873
Iolaus agnes Aurivillius, 1898
Iolaus aurivillii Röber, 1900
Iolaus bellina exquisita (Riley, 1928)
Iolaus coelestis Bethune-Baker, 1926
Iolaus creta Hewitson, 1878
Iolaus cytaeis Hewitson, 1875
Iolaus fontainei (Stempffer, 1956)
Iolaus frater (Joicey & Talbot, 1921)
Iolaus hemicyanus barnsi (Joicey & Talbot, 1921)
Iolaus kelle Stempffer, 1967 (endemic)
Iolaus maesa (Hewitson, 1862)
Iolaus neavei (Druce, 1910)
Iolaus nolaensis (Stempffer, 1951)
Iolaus pollux Aurivillius, 1895
Iolaus sappirus (Druce, 1902)
Iolaus iulus Hewitson, 1869
Iolaus parasilanus (Riley, 1928)
Iolaus alcibiades Kirby, 1871
Iolaus paneperata Druce, 1890
Iolaus poecilaon (Riley, 1928)
Iolaus caesareus cleopatrae Collins & Larsen, 2000
Iolaus timon (Fabricius, 1787)
Pilodeudorix mimeta (Karsch, 1895)
Pilodeudorix ula (Karsch, 1895)
Pilodeudorix virgata (Druce, 1891)
Pilodeudorix anetia (Hulstaert, 1924)
Pilodeudorix angelita (Suffert, 1904)
Pilodeudorix aruma (Hewitson, 1873)
Pilodeudorix azurea (Stempffer, 1964)
Pilodeudorix infuscata (Stempffer, 1964)
Pilodeudorix leonina indentata Libert, 2004
Pilodeudorix mera (Hewitson, 1873)
Pilodeudorix otraeda genuba (Hewitson, 1875)
Pilodeudorix camerona (Plötz, 1880)
Pilodeudorix congoana (Aurivillius, 1923)
Pilodeudorix kohli (Aurivillius, 1921)
Pilodeudorix zela (Hewitson, 1869)
Pilodeudorix hugoi Libert, 2004
Pilodeudorix deritas (Hewitson, 1874)
Pilodeudorix kiellandi (Congdon & Collins, 1998)
Pilodeudorix pseudoderitas (Stempffer, 1964)
Pilodeudorix violetta (Aurivillius, 1897)
Paradeudorix cobaltina (Stempffer, 1964)
Paradeudorix ituri (Bethune-Baker, 1908)
Paradeudorix marginata (Stempffer, 1962)
Paradeudorix moyambina (Bethune-Baker, 1904)
Paradeudorix petersi (Stempffer & Bennett, 1956)
Hypomyrina mimetica Libert, 2004
Hypomyrina fournierae Gabriel, 1939
Deudorix caliginosa Lathy, 1903
Deudorix kayonza Stempffer, 1956
Deudorix lorisona (Hewitson, 1862)
Deudorix odana Druce, 1887

Polyommatinae

Lycaenesthini
Anthene afra (Bethune-Baker, 1910)
Anthene bipuncta (Joicey & Talbot, 1921)
Anthene kampala (Bethune-Baker, 1910)
Anthene lachares (Hewitson, 1878)
Anthene larydas (Cramer, 1780)
Anthene leptines (Hewitson, 1874)
Anthene ligures (Hewitson, 1874)
Anthene liodes (Hewitson, 1874)
Anthene locuples (Grose-Smith, 1898)
Anthene lysicles (Hewitson, 1874)
Anthene mahota (Grose-Smith, 1887)
Anthene makala (Bethune-Baker, 1910)
Anthene ngoko Stempffer, 1962
Anthene pyroptera (Aurivillius, 1895)
Anthene rubricinctus (Holland, 1891)
Anthene scintillula (Holland, 1891)
Anthene sylvanus (Drury, 1773)
Anthene xanthopoecilus (Holland, 1893)
Anthene zenkeri (Karsch, 1895)
Anthene lamprocles (Hewitson, 1878)
Anthene lyzanius (Hewitson, 1874)
Anthene quadricaudata (Bethune-Baker, 1926)
Anthene chryseostictus (Bethune-Baker, 1910)
Anthene likouala Stempffer, 1962
Anthene lusones (Hewitson, 1874)
Anthene lacides (Hewitson, 1874)
Anthene lamias (Hewitson, 1878)
Anthene lucretilis (Hewitson, 1874)
Anthene rufoplagata (Bethune-Baker, 1910)
Cupidesthes arescopa Bethune-Baker, 1910
Cupidesthes caerulea Jackson, 1966
Cupidesthes cuprifascia Joicey & Talbot, 1921
Cupidesthes leonina (Bethune-Baker, 1903)
Cupidesthes mimetica (Druce, 1910)
Cupidesthes robusta Aurivillius, 1895
Cupidesthes thyrsis (Kirby, 1878)

Polyommatini
Cupidopsis cissus extensa Libert, 2003
Uranothauma falkensteini (Dewitz, 1879)
Uranothauma heritsia (Hewitson, 1876)
Phlyaria cyara (Hewitson, 1876)
Cacyreus audeoudi Stempffer, 1936
Tuxentius carana (Hewitson, 1876)
Azanus isis (Drury, 1773)
Thermoniphas alberici (Dufrane, 1945)
Thermoniphas fontainei Stempffer, 1956
Thermoniphas fumosa Stempffer, 1952
Thermoniphas plurilimbata Karsch, 1895
Thermoniphas togara (Plötz, 1880)
Oboronia guessfeldti (Dewitz, 1879)
Oboronia ornata vestalis (Aurivillius, 1895)
Oboronia pseudopunctatus (Strand, 1912)
Oboronia punctatus (Dewitz, 1879)

Riodinidae

Nemeobiinae
Abisara tantalus caerulea Carpenter & Jackson, 1950
Abisara caeca semicaeca Riley, 1932
Abisara rutherfordii herwigii Dewitz, 1887
Abisara gerontes gabunica Riley, 1932

Nymphalidae

Danainae

Danaini
Danaus chrysippus alcippus (Cramer, 1777)
Danaus chrysippus orientis (Aurivillius, 1909)
Amauris niavius (Linnaeus, 1758)
Amauris tartarea Mabille, 1876
Amauris vashti (Butler, 1869)

Satyrinae

Elymniini
Elymniopsis bammakoo (Westwood, [1851])

Melanitini
Gnophodes betsimena parmeno Doubleday, 1849
Gnophodes chelys (Fabricius, 1793)

Satyrini
Bicyclus alboplaga (Rebel, 1914)
Bicyclus auricruda fulgidus Fox, 1963
Bicyclus ephorus bergeri Condamin, 1965
Bicyclus evadne elionias (Hewitson, 1866)
Bicyclus golo (Aurivillius, 1893)
Bicyclus hewitsoni (Doumet, 1861)
Bicyclus iccius (Hewitson, 1865)
Bicyclus ignobilis eurini Condamin & Fox, 1963
Bicyclus italus (Hewitson, 1865)
Bicyclus mandanes Hewitson, 1873
Bicyclus medontias (Hewitson, 1873)
Bicyclus nobilis (Aurivillius, 1893)
Bicyclus rhacotis (Hewitson, 1866)
Bicyclus martius sanaos (Hewitson, 1866)
Bicyclus sandace (Hewitson, 1877)
Bicyclus sciathis (Hewitson, 1866)
Bicyclus sophrosyne (Plötz, 1880)
Bicyclus sweadneri Fox, 1963
Bicyclus technatis (Hewitson, 1877)
Bicyclus trilophus (Rebel, 1914)
Bicyclus vulgaris (Butler, 1868)
Bicyclus xeneas (Hewitson, 1866)
Bicyclus xeneoides Condamin, 1961
Hallelesis asochis congoensis (Joicey & Talbot, 1921)
Heteropsis peitho (Plötz, 1880)
Ypthima doleta Kirby, 1880
Ypthima impura Elwes & Edwards, 1893
Ypthima pulchra Overlaet, 1954
Ypthima pupillaris Butler, 1888

Charaxinae

Charaxini
Charaxes fulvescens (Aurivillius, 1891)
Charaxes protoclea protonothodes van Someren, 1971
Charaxes boueti Feisthamel, 1850
Charaxes cynthia kinduana Le Cerf, 1923
Charaxes lucretius intermedius van Someren, 1971
Charaxes lactetinctus Karsch, 1892
Charaxes castor (Cramer, 1775)
Charaxes brutus angustus Rothschild, 1900
Charaxes pollux (Cramer, 1775)
Charaxes druceanus brazza Turlin, 1987
Charaxes eudoxus mechowi Rothschild, 1900
Charaxes richelmanni Röber, 1936
Charaxes numenes aequatorialis van Someren, 1972
Charaxes tiridates tiridatinus Röber, 1936
Charaxes bipunctatus ugandensis van Someren, 1972
Charaxes mixtus Rothschild, 1894
Charaxes bohemani Felder & Felder, 1859
Charaxes smaragdalis smaragdalis Butler, 1866
Charaxes smaragdalis leopoldi Ghesquiére, 1933
Charaxes imperialis dargei Collins, 1989
Charaxes ameliae Doumet, 1861
Charaxes pythodoris occidens van Someren, 1963
Charaxes hadrianus Ward, 1871
Charaxes nobilis Druce, 1873
Charaxes superbus Schultze, 1909
Charaxes lydiae Holland, 1917
Charaxes acraeoides Druce, 1908
Charaxes fournierae Le Moult, 1930
Charaxes zingha (Stoll, 1780)
Charaxes etesipe (Godart, 1824)
Charaxes penricei dealbata van Someren, 1966
Charaxes eupale latimargo Joicey & Talbot, 1921
Charaxes subornatus Schultze, 1916
Charaxes anticlea proadusta van Someren, 1971
Charaxes thysi Capronnier, 1889
Charaxes hildebrandti (Dewitz, 1879)
Charaxes virilis van Someren & Jackson, 1952
Charaxes catachrous van Someren & Jackson, 1952
Charaxes etheocles ochracea van Someren & Jackson, 1957
Charaxes cedreatis Hewitson, 1874
Charaxes subrubidus van Someren, 1972
Charaxes viola picta van Someren & Jackson, 1952
Charaxes pleione congoensis Plantrou, 1989
Charaxes paphianus Ward, 1871
Charaxes kahldeni Homeyer & Dewitz, 1882
Charaxes nichetes Grose-Smith, 1883
Charaxes lycurgus bernardiana Plantrou, 1978
Charaxes zelica rougeoti Plantrou, 1978
Charaxes porthos Grose-Smith, 1883
Charaxes doubledayi Aurivillius, 1899
Charaxes mycerina nausicaa Staudinger, 1891
Charaxes galleyanus Darge & , 1984 (endemic)
Charaxes matakall Darge, 1985
Charaxes teissieri Darge & , 1984 (endemic)

Euxanthini
Charaxes crossleyi (Ward, 1871)
Charaxes trajanus (Ward, 1871)

Pallini
Palla publius centralis van Someren, 1975
Palla ussheri dobelli (Hall, 1919)
Palla decius (Cramer, 1777)
Palla violinitens coniger (Butler, 1896)

Nymphalinae
Kallimoides rumia jadyae (Fox, 1968)
Vanessula milca buechneri Dewitz, 1887

Nymphalini
Antanartia delius (Drury, 1782)
Junonia stygia (Aurivillius, 1894)
Junonia gregorii Butler, 1896
Junonia terea (Drury, 1773)
Junonia westermanni Westwood, 1870
Junonia cymodoce lugens (Schultze, 1912)
Salamis cacta (Fabricius, 1793)
Protogoniomorpha parhassus (Drury, 1782)
Protogoniomorpha temora (Felder & Felder, 1867)
Precis ceryne (Boisduval, 1847)
Precis octavia (Cramer, 1777)
Precis sinuata Plötz, 1880
Hypolimnas anthedon (Doubleday, 1845)
Hypolimnas dinarcha (Hewitson, 1865)
Hypolimnas mechowi (Dewitz, 1884)
Hypolimnas misippus (Linnaeus, 1764)
Hypolimnas monteironis (Druce, 1874)
Hypolimnas salmacis (Drury, 1773)

Cyrestinae

Cyrestini
Cyrestis camillus (Fabricius, 1781)

Biblidinae

Biblidini
Mesoxantha ethosea ethoseoides Rebel, 1914
Ariadne actisanes (Hewitson, 1875)
Ariadne albifascia (Joicey & Talbot, 1921)
Ariadne enotrea suffusa (Joicey & Talbot, 1921)
Neptidopsis ophione (Cramer, 1777)
Eurytela alinda Mabille, 1893

Epicaliini
Sevenia amulia amulia (Cramer, 1777)
Sevenia amulia benguelae (Chapman, 1872)
Sevenia boisduvali omissa (Rothschild, 1918)
Sevenia consors (Rothschild & Jordan, 1903)
Sevenia morantii (Trimen, 1881)
Sevenia occidentalium (Mabille, 1876)
Sevenia pechueli sangbae (Hecq & Peeters, 1992)

Limenitinae

Limenitidini
Cymothoe altisidora (Hewitson, 1869)
Cymothoe anitorgis (Hewitson, 1874)
Cymothoe aramis aramis (Hewitson, 1865)
Cymothoe aramis schoutedeni Overlaet, 1952
Cymothoe arcuata Overlaet, 1945
Cymothoe beckeri (Herrich-Schaeffer, 1858)
Cymothoe caenis (Drury, 1773)
Cymothoe capella (Ward, 1871)
Cymothoe caprina Aurivillius, 1897
Cymothoe coccinata (Hewitson, 1874)
Cymothoe distincta Overlaet, 1944
Cymothoe confusa Aurivillius, 1887
Cymothoe eris Aurivillius, 1896
Cymothoe excelsa Neustetter, 1912
Cymothoe fontainei debauchei Overlaet, 1952
Cymothoe fumana balluca Fox & Howarth, 1968
Cymothoe fumana villiersi Fox, 1968
Cymothoe haynae diphyia Karsch, 1894
Cymothoe heliada (Hewitson, 1874)
Cymothoe herminia (Grose-Smith, 1887)
Cymothoe hesiodotus Staudinger, 1890
Cymothoe hyarbita hyarbita (Hewitson, 1866)
Cymothoe hyarbita hyarbitina Aurivillius, 1897
Cymothoe indamora (Hewitson, 1866)
Cymothoe jodutta ciceronis (Ward, 1871)
Cymothoe lucasii binotorum Darge, 1985
Cymothoe lucasii minigorum Darge, 1985
Cymothoe lurida hesione Weymer, 1907
Cymothoe lurida tristis Overlaet, 1952
Cymothoe oemilius (Doumet, 1859)
Cymothoe orphnina suavis Schultze, 1913
Cymothoe reinholdi (Plötz, 1880)
Cymothoe sangaris (Godart, 1824)
Pseudoneptis bugandensis ianthe Hemming, 1964
Pseudacraea boisduvalii (Doubleday, 1845)
Pseudacraea clarkii Butler & Rothschild, 1892
Pseudacraea dolomena (Hewitson, 1865)
Pseudacraea rubrobasalis Aurivillius, 1903
Pseudacraea eurytus (Linnaeus, 1758)
Pseudacraea kuenowii gottbergi Dewitz, 1884
Pseudacraea lucretia protracta (Butler, 1874)
Pseudacraea semire (Cramer, 1779)
Pseudacraea warburgi Aurivillius, 1892

Neptidini
Neptis agouale Pierre-Baltus, 1978
Neptis alta Overlaet, 1955
Neptis continuata Holland, 1892
Neptis jamesoni Godman & Salvin, 1890
Neptis kiriakoffi Overlaet, 1955
Neptis lermanni Aurivillius, 1896
Neptis liberti Pierre & Pierre-Baltus, 1998
Neptis melicerta (Drury, 1773)
Neptis metanira Holland, 1892
Neptis mixophyes Holland, 1892
Neptis morosa Overlaet, 1955
Neptis nebrodes Hewitson, 1874
Neptis nicobule Holland, 1892
Neptis nicomedes Hewitson, 1874
Neptis nicoteles Hewitson, 1874
Neptis nysiades Hewitson, 1868
Neptis seeldrayersi Aurivillius, 1895
Neptis serena Overlaet, 1955
Neptis strigata Aurivillius, 1894
Neptis trigonophora melicertula Strand, 1912
Neptis troundi Pierre-Baltus, 1978

Adoliadini
Catuna angustatum (Felder & Felder, 1867)
Catuna oberthueri Karsch, 1894
Euryphura athymoides Berger, 1981
Euryphura chalcis (Felder & Felder, 1860)
Euryphura plautilla (Hewitson, 1865)
Euryphura porphyrion grassei Bernardi, 1965
Euryphurana nobilis (Staudinger, 1891)
Pseudargynnis hegemone (Godart, 1819)
Aterica galene extensa Heron, 1909
Cynandra opis bernardii Lagnel, 1967
Euriphene splendida Collins & Larsen, 1997 (endemic)
Euriphene abasa (Hewitson, 1866)
Euriphene amicia (Hewitson, 1871)
Euriphene atossa (Hewitson, 1865)
Euriphene atropurpurea (Aurivillius, 1894)
Euriphene atrovirens (Mabille, 1878)
Euriphene barombina (Aurivillius, 1894)
Euriphene gambiae gabonica Bernardi, 1966
Euriphene glaucopis (Gaede, 1916)
Euriphene grosesmithi (Staudinger, 1891)
Euriphene incerta (Aurivillius, 1912)
Euriphene karschi (Aurivillius, 1894)
Euriphene milnei (Hewitson, 1865)
Euriphene mundula (Grünberg, 1910)
Euriphene pinkieana Bernardi, 1975
Euriphene lysandra (Stoll, 1790)
Euriphene melanops (Aurivillius, 1897)
Bebearia tentyris seeldrayersi (Aurivillius, 1899)
Bebearia carshena (Hewitson, 1871)
Bebearia absolon (Fabricius, 1793)
Bebearia micans (Aurivillius, 1899)
Bebearia zonara (Butler, 1871)
Bebearia mandinga (Felder & Felder, 1860)
Bebearia oxione squalida (Talbot, 1928)
Bebearia abesa (Hewitson, 1869)
Bebearia partita (Aurivillius, 1895)
Bebearia barce maculata (Aurivillius, 1912)
Bebearia mardania (Fabricius, 1793)
Bebearia cocalioides Hecq, 1988
Bebearia guineensis (Felder & Felder, 1867)
Bebearia cocalia katera (van Someren, 1939)
Bebearia paludicola Holmes, 2001
Bebearia sophus (Fabricius, 1793)
Bebearia staudingeri (Aurivillius, 1893)
Bebearia plistonax (Hewitson, 1874)
Bebearia elpinice (Hewitson, 1869)
Bebearia congolensis (Capronnier, 1889)
Bebearia phranza phranza (Hewitson, 1865)
Bebearia phranza fuscara Hecq, 1989
Bebearia laetitia (Plötz, 1880)
Bebearia flaminia (Staudinger, 1891)
Bebearia nivaria (Ward, 1871)
Bebearia phantasia concolor Hecq, 1988
Bebearia maledicta (Strand, 1912)
Bebearia tessmanni kwiluensis Hecq, 1989
Bebearia cutteri cognata (Grünberg, 1910)
Bebearia eliensis (Hewitson, 1866)
Bebearia barombina (Staudinger, 1896)
Bebearia octogramma (Grose-Smith & Kirby, 1889)
Bebearia chloeropis (Bethune-Baker, 1908)
Bebearia cinaethon (Hewitson, 1874)
Bebearia intermedia (Bartel, 1905)
Euphaedra lupercoides Rothschild, 1918
Euphaedra medon celestis Hecq, 1986
Euphaedra ombrophila Hecq, 1981 (endemic)
Euphaedra clio Hecq, 1981
Euphaedra zaddachii elephantina Staudinger, 1891
Euphaedra mbamou Hecq, 1987
Euphaedra hewitsoni Hecq, 1974
Euphaedra lata Hecq, 1980
Euphaedra hollandi Hecq, 1974
Euphaedra diffusa Gaede, 1916
Euphaedra imitans Holland, 1893
Euphaedra aureola Kirby, 1889
Euphaedra splendens Hecq, 1992
Euphaedra campaspe (Felder & Felder, 1867)
Euphaedra congo Hecq, 1985
Euphaedra adonina spectacularis Hecq, 1997
Euphaedra piriformis Hecq, 1982
Euphaedra ceres electra Hecq, 1983
Euphaedra sarita (Sharpe, 1891)
Euphaedra grilloti Hecq, 1983
Euphaedra rezia (Hewitson, 1866)
Euphaedra jacksoni Hecq, 1980
Euphaedra demeter Hecq, 1983
Euphaedra subprotea Hecq, 1986
Euphaedra fascinata Hecq, 1984
Euphaedra eleus (Drury, 1782)
Euphaedra simplex Hecq, 1978
Euphaedra asteria Hecq, 1993 (endemic)
Euphaedra edwardsii (van der Hoeven, 1845)
Euphaedra ruspina (Hewitson, 1865)
Euphaedra losinga wardi (Druce, 1874)
Euphaedra mambili Hecq, 2001
Euptera choveti Amiet & Collins, 1998
Euptera crowleyi centralis Libert, 1995
Euptera elabontas (Hewitson, 1871)
Euptera falsathyma Schultze, 1916
Euptera mimetica Collins & Amiet, 1998
Euptera mocquerysi Staudinger, 1893
Euptera pluto (Ward, 1873)
Pseudathyma callina (Grose-Smith, 1898)
Pseudathyma cyrili Chovet, 2002
Pseudathyma martini Collins, 2002
Pseudathyma michelae Libert, 2002
Pseudathyma neptidina Karsch, 1894

Heliconiinae

Acraeini
Acraea admatha Hewitson, 1865
Acraea camaena (Drury, 1773)
Acraea endoscota Le Doux, 1928
Acraea leucographa Ribbe, 1889
Acraea neobule Doubleday, 1847
Acraea quirina (Fabricius, 1781)
Acraea cepheus (Linnaeus, 1758)
Acraea abdera Hewitson, 1852
Acraea egina (Cramer, 1775)
Acraea pseudegina Westwood, 1852
Acraea rogersi Hewitson, 1873
Acraea consanguinea (Aurivillius, 1899)
Acraea elongata (Butler, 1874)
Acraea epaea (Cramer, 1779)
Acraea epiprotea (Butler, 1874)
Acraea excisa (Butler, 1874)
Acraea tellus (Aurivillius, 1893)
Acraea vestalis stavelia (Suffert, 1904)
Acraea acerata Hewitson, 1874
Acraea alciope Hewitson, 1852
Acraea aurivillii Staudinger, 1896
Acraea circeis (Drury, 1782)
Acraea serena (Fabricius, 1775)
Acraea jodutta (Fabricius, 1793)
Acraea oberthueri Butler, 1895
Acraea peneleos pelasgius Grose-Smith, 1900
Acraea vesperalis Grose-Smith, 1890
Acraea penelope Staudinger, 1896
Acraea perenna Doubleday, 1847
Acraea odzalae Collins, 1997 (endemic)

Vagrantini
Lachnoptera anticlia (Hübner, 1819)
Phalanta eurytis (Doubleday, 1847)
Phalanta phalantha aethiopica (Rothschild & Jordan, 1903)

Hesperiidae

Coeliadinae
Coeliades bixana Evans, 1940
Coeliades forestan (Stoll, [1782])
Coeliades hanno (Plötz, 1879)
Coeliades libeon (Druce, 1875)
Coeliades pisistratus (Fabricius, 1793)
Pyrrhochalcia iphis (Drury, 1773)

Pyrginae

Celaenorrhinini
Loxolexis holocausta (Mabille, 1891)
Celaenorrhinus aureus Collins & Larsen, 2005 (endemic)
Celaenorrhinus beni Bethune-Baker, 1908
Celaenorrhinus boadicea (Hewitson, 1877)
Celaenorrhinus chrysoglossa (Mabille, 1891)
Celaenorrhinus homeyeri (Plötz, 1880)
Celaenorrhinus illustris (Mabille, 1891)
Celaenorrhinus illustroides Miller, 1971
Celaenorrhinus meditrina (Hewitson, 1877)
Celaenorrhinus nigropunctata Bethune-Baker, 1908
Celaenorrhinus ovalis Evans, 1937
Celaenorrhinus rutilans (Mabille, 1877)
Sarangesa majorella (Mabille, 1891)
Sarangesa tertullianus (Fabricius, 1793)
Sarangesa thecla (Plötz, 1879)

Tagiadini
Tagiades flesus (Fabricius, 1781)
Eagris decastigma fuscosa (Holland, 1893)
Eagris lucetia (Hewitson, 1875)
Eagris subalbida aurivillii (Neustetter, 1927)
Eagris tetrastigma (Mabille, 1891)
Calleagris lacteus (Mabille, 1877)
Calleagris landbecki (Druce, 1910)
Procampta rara Holland, 1892
Abantis contigua Evans, 1937
Abantis efulensis Holland, 1896
Abantis ja Druce, 1909
Abantis leucogaster (Mabille, 1890)
Abantis lucretia etoumbiensis Miller, 1971
Abantis rubra Holland, 1920

Carcharodini
Spialia ploetzi (Aurivillius, 1891)

Hesperiinae

Aeromachini
Astictopterus abjecta (Snellen, 1872)
Kedestes brunneostriga (Plötz, 1884)
Gorgyra afikpo Druce, 1909
Gorgyra bina Evans, 1937
Gorgyra diversata Evans, 1937
Gorgyra kalinzu Evans, 1949
Gorgyra minima Holland, 1896
Gorgyra mocquerysii Holland, 1896
Gorgyra rubescens Holland, 1896
Gorgyra sara Evans, 1937
Gyrogra subnotata (Holland, 1894)
Teniorhinus ignita (Mabille, 1877)
Teniorhinus watsoni Holland, 1892
Ceratrichia argyrosticta (Plötz, 1879)
Ceratrichia aurea Druce, 1910
Ceratrichia clara medea Evans, 1937
Ceratrichia flava Hewitson, 1878
Ceratrichia phocion camerona Miller, 1971
Ceratrichia semlikensis Joicey & Talbot, 1921
Ceratrichia wollastoni Heron, 1909
Pardaleodes bule Holland, 1896
Pardaleodes edipus (Stoll, 1781)
Pardaleodes incerta murcia (Plötz, 1883)
Pardaleodes sator pusiella Mabille, 1877
Pardaleodes tibullus (Fabricius, 1793)
Pardaleodes xanthopeplus Holland, 1892
Xanthodisca astrape (Holland, 1892)
Rhabdomantis galatia (Hewitson, 1868)
Rhabdomantis sosia (Mabille, 1891)
Osmodes adosus (Mabille, 1890)
Osmodes banghaasii Holland, 1896
Osmodes costatus Aurivillius, 1896
Osmodes distincta Holland, 1896
Osmodes hollandi Evans, 1937
Osmodes lux Holland, 1892
Osmodes omar Swinhoe, 1916
Osmodes thora (Plötz, 1884)
Osphantes ogowena (Mabille, 1891)
Acleros ploetzi Mabille, 1890
Semalea arela (Mabille, 1891)
Semalea pulvina (Plötz, 1879)
Semalea sextilis (Plötz, 1886)
Hypoleucis ophiusa (Hewitson, 1866)
Hypoleucis tripunctata truda Evans, 1937
Meza cybeutes (Holland, 1894)
Meza elba (Evans, 1937)
Meza indusiata (Mabille, 1891)
Meza mabea (Holland, 1894)
Paronymus xanthias (Mabille, 1891)
Paronymus xanthioides (Holland, 1892)
Andronymus caesar (Fabricius, 1793)
Andronymus evander (Mabille, 1890)
Andronymus gander Evans, 1947
Andronymus helles Evans, 1937
Andronymus hero Evans, 1937
Andronymus marcus Usher, 1980
Andronymus neander (Plötz, 1884)
Gamia buchholzi (Plötz, 1879)
Gamia shelleyi (Sharpe, 1890)
Artitropa cama Evans, 1937
Artitropa comus (Stoll, 1782)
Artitropa reducta Aurivillius, 1925
Mopala orma (Plötz, 1879)
Gretna cylinda (Hewitson, 1876)
Gretna lacida (Hewitson, 1876)
Gretna waga (Plötz, 1886)
Gretna zaremba (Plötz, 1884)
Pteroteinon caenira (Hewitson, 1867)
Pteroteinon capronnieri (Plötz, 1879)
Pteroteinon ceucaenira (Druce, 1910)
Pteroteinon concaenira Belcastro & Larsen, 1996
Pteroteinon iricolor (Holland, 1890)
Pteroteinon laterculus (Holland, 1890)
Pteroteinon laufella (Hewitson, 1868)
Pteroteinon pruna Evans, 1937
Leona binoevatus (Mabille, 1891)
Leona leonora (Plötz, 1879)
Leona meloui (Riley, 1926)
Caenides kangvensis Holland, 1896
Caenides xychus (Mabille, 1891)
Caenides benga (Holland, 1891)
Caenides dacela (Hewitson, 1876)
Caenides hidaroides Aurivillius, 1896
Caenides dacena (Hewitson, 1876)
Monza alberti (Holland, 1896)
Monza cretacea (Snellen, 1872)
Melphina malthina (Hewitson, 1876)
Melphina statirides (Holland, 1896)
Melphina tarace (Mabille, 1891)
Melphina unistriga (Holland, 1893)
Fresna carlo Evans, 1937
Fresna cojo (Karsch, 1893)
Fresna netopha (Hewitson, 1878)
Platylesches affinissima Strand, 1921

Baorini
Borbo binga (Evans, 1937)
Borbo fallax (Gaede, 1916)
Borbo holtzi (Plötz, 1883)
Borbo perobscura (Druce, 1912)

See also
List of moths of the Republic of the Congo
Congolian forests
Forest-savanna mosaic
Albertine Rift montane forests
List of ecoregions in the Republic of the Congo
Geography of the Republic of the Congo

References

Seitz, A. Die Gross-Schmetterlinge der Erde 13: Die Afrikanischen Tagfalter. Plates
Seitz, A. Die Gross-Schmetterlinge der Erde 13: Die Afrikanischen Tagfalter. Text (in German)

 Butterflies

Republic of the Congo
Butterflies
Republic of the Congo